Gogipeth  is a village in the southern state of Karnataka, India. It is located in the Shahapur taluk of Yadgir district in Karnataka. Gogipeth is a companion village to Gogikona which lies less than half a kilometre to the southeast, across a small stream, and together the two are often known as "Gogi".

Demographics
As of 2001 India census, Gogipeth had a population of 6,557 with 3,297 males and 3,260 females.

See also
 Yadgir

References

External links
 

Villages in Yadgir district